The 2012 Blues season is the team's 17th season in the Super Rugby competition. The Blues' pre-season began on February 4, and the regular season began on February 24. The team will play 16 regular season matches, with byes in rounds 6 and 16. The Blues will play all teams within the New Zealand conference twice, and all other teams once, with the exception of the New South Wales Waratahs and Cheetahs. The team were captained by Keven Mealamu and coached by Pat Lam.

Pre-season

The first of three pre-season fixtures was held on the 4th of February at Toll Stadium against the Hurricanes. This was followed by an away match against the Melbourne Rebels on February 11 and a "home" match on February 18 against the Highlanders at UNITEC, in Mt Albert.

Fixtures

Regular season

The Blues regular season began on February 24 with a home fixture against the Crusaders, and finished on July 14, away to the Brumbies.

Fixtures

Player Summary
Player statistics for the 2012 season are shown below:

Overall Summary

Legend: Apps. = Appearances, Cons. = Conversions, Pens. = Penalties, Drps. = Drop Goals, Pts. = Total points, W.C. = White cards, Y.C. = Yellow cards, R.C. = Red cards

Top Point Scorers

Top Try Scorers

Standings

The final standings for the 2012 season are shown below:

 Legend: Pos = Position, Rnd = Round, W = Win, D = Draw, L = Loss, PF = Points For, PA = Points Against, PD = Points Difference, TB = Four-try bonus points, LB = Close loss bonus points, Pts = Competition Points

Round by Round Result Summary

 Legend: H = Home, A = Away, W = Win, D = Draw, L = Loss, B = Bye, Pos. = Position, Conf. = Conference

See also
2012 Super Rugby season

External links
 Blues website
 Official SANZAR Super Rugby website
 Official New Zealand Super Rugby website

References

2012
2012 in New Zealand rugby union
2012 Super Rugby season by team